Jesús Codina Burgon (18 December 1938 – 19 July 1999) was a Spanish basketball player. He competed in the men's tournament at the 1960 Summer Olympics and the 1968 Summer Olympics.

Notes

References

External links
 
 
 
 

1938 births
1999 deaths
Spanish men's basketball players
Olympic basketball players of Spain
Basketball players at the 1960 Summer Olympics
Basketball players at the 1968 Summer Olympics
People from Segovia
Sportspeople from the Province of Segovia
CB Estudiantes coaches